Matthew Gahan (born 26 November 1975) in Lismore, New South Wales is an Australian baseball player who is currently a free agent and plays for the Australian national team.

Career
Matty was signed in 2000 by the New York Mets organisation and played with the Brooklyn Cyclones and Capital City Bombers in 2001, before being promoted to Advanced A with the St. Lucie Mets in 2002. Gahan also played in the International Baseball League of Australia with the International All-Stars in 2000/2001. He has since played Claxton Shield from 2003 to present with the Queensland Rams (as Lismore is considered part of Baseball Queensland), including a Golden Arm award in the 2006 Claxton Shield, and made his national debut in 2002, including appearances in the 2006 and 2009 World Baseball Classic.

References

ABF Profile

1975 births
Living people
Australian expatriate baseball players in the United States
Baseball pitchers
Brooklyn Cyclones players
Capital City Bombers players
People from Lismore, New South Wales
Sportsmen from New South Wales
St. Lucie Mets players
2006 World Baseball Classic players
2009 World Baseball Classic players